Lee Jong-kyung (born 28 October 1973) is a South Korean ice sledge hockey player. He played in the 2010, 2014, 2018 and 2022 Paralympic Winter Games. He won a silver medal at the 2012 IPC Ice Sledge Hockey World Championships, and 3 bronze medals at the 2018 Winter Paralympics and the 2017 and 2019 World Para Ice Hockey Championships. Lee was a member of South Korea's bronze medal winning team in para ice hockey at the 2018 Winter Paralympics.

References

External links 
 

1973 births
Living people
South Korean sledge hockey players
Paralympic sledge hockey players of South Korea
Paralympic bronze medalists for South Korea
Ice sledge hockey players at the 2010 Winter Paralympics
Ice sledge hockey players at the 2014 Winter Paralympics
Para ice hockey players at the 2018 Winter Paralympics
Para ice hockey players at the 2022 Winter Paralympics
Medalists at the 2018 Winter Paralympics
Paralympic medalists in sledge hockey